Martin L. C. Wilmarth House is a historic home located at Glens Falls, Warren County, New York.  It was built about 1910 and is a square, 2-story, frame Colonial Revival–style residence.  It is topped by a hipped roof with decorative balustrade. The architect was Ephraim Potter. Also on the property is a -story frame carriage house.

It was added to the National Register of Historic Places in 1984.

References

Houses on the National Register of Historic Places in New York (state)
Colonial Revival architecture in New York (state)
Houses completed in 1910
Houses in Warren County, New York
National Register of Historic Places in Warren County, New York